Infant massage is a type of complementary and alternative treatment that uses massage therapy for babies. Evidence is insufficient to support its use in either full term or preterm babies to achieve physical growth.

History
Ayurvedic medicine in ancient India taught the use of infant massage. It was also has been encouraged in China during the Qing dynasty. At present it is part of traditional childcare in South Asia and elsewhere where daily massage by mothers is seen as "instilling fearlessness, hardening bone structure, enhancing movement and limb coordination, and increasing weight". Other areas where infant massage is regularly used are African countries and areas in the former Soviet Union.  In Western culture, infant massage has been increasingly used in neonatal intensive care units for pre-term infants who are in stressful environments and have limited tactile stimulation.

Research

A 2013 Cochrane review of massage therapy for babies less than 6 months of age who were born at term found that the evidence was insufficient to support its use. A 2004 Cochrane review looking at massage therapy for pre-term and low birth weight was insufficient to justify its use.

Proposed mechanisms

Various mechanisms have been proposed as to suggest how massage therapy might benefit infants.  For pre-term infants, it has been suggested that any weight gain may be due to improved metabolic efficiency or by reducing the adverse reaction of stress through decreasing stress behavior or stress hormones.  Other possible mechanisms include increased vagal activity and secretion of insulin and gastrin as well as improved parent-infant relationships.

Safety

Reviews of the literature have found no significant risks for adverse events with massage theory with either full term or pre-term infants.  One study found that the use of certain oils in traditional societies such as mustard oil or olive oil might adversely affect pre-term newborn skin barrier function, while  using other oils that are linoleate-enriched such as sunflower seed oil may improve the integrity and permeability of the skin.

See also
Babywearing
Haptic communication
Kangaroo care
Pediatric massage
Swaddling

References

Babycare
Pediatrics
Massage therapy